Steve Christensen (born April 23, 1978) is a Grammy Award winning American recording engineer, record producer and musician.

Career 

Steve began his recording career in Houston, Texas at SugarHill Recording Studios in 1998 as an intern and quickly moved up to lead engineer by 2000. His work includes international touring as live sound engineer for Destiny's Child and studio albums by Jermaine Dupri, Cash Money Records, Steve Earle, Khruangbin and Robert Ellis. Steve operates his own studio in downtown Houston, Texas.

Awards and nominations 
 Grammy Award for Best Contemporary Folk Album: 2009, for Steve Earle – "Townes"

Selected discography

References

External links 
 
 [ Allmusic Credits]

1978 births
Living people
American audio engineers
Record producers from Texas
Grammy Award winners
Musicians from Houston